Harry Villegas Tamayo (March 10, 1938 - January 2020) was an soldier and revolutionary fighter from Cuba who was awarded Hero of the Republic of Cuba, Highest Decoration of Cuba. He was one of the two soldiers of Cuba who survived and escaped when Che Guevara himself was killed.

Personal life 
He was born in March 10, 1938 in Yara, Cuba. His father was a carpenter and student of Cuban history. He died in January 2020.

References 

1938 births
20th-century Cuban military personnel
2020 deaths
People of the Cuban Revolution
People from Yara, Cuba